Aravelian was a principality within the ancient Kingdom of Armenia, in northeastern Anatolia. It was largely autonomous between 400 and 800 AD.

In 451, it is reported that there were four rulers that acted jointly: Phapag, Phabak, Varonden and Tal or Dal Aravelian. In 640 the ruler was Khatchean Aravelian.

See also
List of regions of old Armenia

Early medieval Armenian regions